The Argens is a 116 km long river of the French Riviera. Its  drainage basin is fully included in the Var department.

The river goes through Vidauban, Le Muy, Roquebrune-sur-Argens, Fréjus, then it flows into the Mediterranean Sea, near Fréjus.

Name 
The river is attested as ad flumen Argenteum in the 1st century BC, Argenteus in the 1st century AD, and A̓rgentíou (Ἀργεντίου) in the 2nd century. It derives from the Latin or Celtic word for 'silver'.

Rivers flowing into Argens

 Blavet
 Endre
 Bresque
 Caramy
 Issole
 Cassole
 Ribeirotte
 Florieye
 Aille
 Nartuby
 Reyran

References

Bibliography

Rivers of France
0Argens
Rivers of Provence-Alpes-Côte d'Azur
Rivers of Var (department)